Coelogyne planiscapa is an orchid endemic to Borneo.

planiscapa